Joe Mbu (born 11 November 1983), also known by the nickname of "Big Joe", is a Zairean former professional rugby league footballer and coach. Mbu played for the London Broncos/Harlequins RL in the Super League. He is the current head coach of the London Skolars.

Playing career

He was a product of the London Broncos academy setup, having played his early rugby league at the London Skolars. As a teenager Mbu also played rugby union as well, playing for an extremely successful Finchley RFC youth team in North London.

In 2002, Joe was loaned out by the London Broncos to the Huddersfield Giants to gain experience in their Senior Academy side. He started the 2003 season with a similar loan-out at Leeds Rhinos before being recalled to the London Broncos to make his Super League début.

Mbu played in the Super League for the London Broncos/Harlequins RL from 2003 to 2006. He became a crowd favourite amongst the London Broncos fans for his solid and dependable performances for the club.

Mbu joined the National League One team Doncaster for the 2007 season and was appointed captain.

He rejoined the renamed Harlequins RL midway through the 2007 season due to Doncaster's financial difficulties. He remained at the Harlequins RL before retiring at the end of the 2009 season.

Coaching career
After retirement, Mbu coached London Skolars Under 16s in 2010. The team finished bottom of the table after winning only two games.

In October 2010 London Skolars appointed Joe Mbu as their head coach. now coaches Staines RFC June 2014

On 5 Nov 2021 Joe was re-appointed as head-coach of London Skolars, following the departure of Jermaine Coleman

He has coached Nigeria.

References

External links
 Super League Stats

1983 births
Living people
Black British sportsmen
British rugby league coaches
British rugby league players
Democratic Republic of the Congo emigrants to England
Doncaster R.L.F.C. players
Huddersfield Giants players
Leeds Rhinos players
London Broncos players
London Skolars coaches
London Skolars players
Nigeria national rugby league team coaches
Rugby league second-rows